Task Force 72 may refer to:

Task Force 72 (United States Navy)
Task Force 72 (model boat builders)